The Smoke of Hell is the debut studio album by the American rock and roll band The Supersuckers. It was released on September 1, 1992, on Sub Pop records. The cover art was by the comic book artist Daniel Clowes.

Track listing
"Coattail Rider"
"Luck"
"I Say Fuck"
"Alone and Stinking"
"Caliente"
"Tasty Greens"
"Hell City, Hell"
"Hot Rod Rally"
"Drink and Complain"
"Mighty Joe Young"
"Ron's Got the Cocaine"
"Sweet 'n' Sour Jesus"
"Retarded Bill"
"Thinkin' 'bout Revenge"

References

Supersuckers albums
1992 debut albums
Sub Pop albums
Albums produced by Jack Endino